A Physical Presence is a two-disc live album by the British jazz-funk pop group Level 42, released in June 1985 and recorded in England during March of that year at The Coronet Woolwich, The Hexagon, Reading and Goldiggers, Chippenham, Wiltshire. This album is notable for being the first live album by Level 42, and for containing a previously unreleased song ("Follow Me", which was later remixed and issued as part of an EP.) and a live recording of a non-LP track ("Foundation & Empire", originally the B-side of "Starchild", available on the 2000 CD reissue of "Level 42)". "Love Games" is preceded by an extended bass intro, which contains also part of "Dune Tune". Also, the first track ("Almost There") starts with a taped intro which quotes "Hot Water".

Originally issued in the UK as a two-album set and long-play cassette, the version issued on CD consisted of a single disc, omitting three tracks ("Turn it On", "Mr Pink" and "88"). Those tracks were restored when the remastered version of the album was issued in a two-CD set in 2000.

Track listing

Disc one

"Almost There" (Mark King, Phil Gould, Rowland "Boon" Gould) – 6:47
"Turn It On" (Wally Badarou, P. Gould, R. Gould, King) – 5:47
"Mr. Pink" (Badarou, King) – 6:08
"Eyes Waterfalling"  (King, P. Gould, Mike Lindup, R. Gould) – 5:20
"Kansas City Milkman"  (Badarou, King, Lindup, P. Gould) – 7:17
"Follow Me" (King, R. Gould) – 5:01
"Foundation & Empire" (King) – 8:39

Disc two

"The Chant Has Begun" (King, P. Gould) – 6:12
"The Chinese Way"  (King, P. Gould, Badarou) – 4:47
"The Sun Goes Down (Living It Up)"  (Badarou, King, Lindup, P. Gould) – 4:59
"Hot Water" (King, P. Gould, Lindup, Badarou) – 6:24
"Love Games" (King, P. Gould) – 9:44
"88" (King) – 12:33

EP Release

"A Physical Presence" is a Live EP and song by Level 42.

The EP features songs from their 1985 live album of the same name.
In various other markets, the lead track "Follow Me" was released as a standard single.

Track listing

12" EP release
Follow Me
Mr Pink
Turn it On
Kansas City Milkman

7" release
Follow Me
Turn it On
Kansas City Milkman

Personnel 
Level 42
 Mark King – bass guitar, vocals
 Mike Lindup – keyboards, vocals
 Phil Gould – drums, backing vocals
 Boon Gould – guitars

Plus:
 Krys Mach – saxophones

Production 
 Gregg Jackman – producer, mixing 
 Level 42 – producers, mixing 
 Mick McKenna – engineer 
 John Irving – assistant engineer 
 Charlie MacPherson – assistant engineer
 Roger Howorth – mix assistant 
 Rob O'Connor – sleeve design, screen print 
 Simon Fowler – photography
 Alex Madjitey – back sleeve photography 
 John Gould – management 
 Sarah Gould – management

References 

Level 42 albums
1985 live albums